Rhytiphora modesta is a species of beetle in the family Cerambycidae. It was described by Thomas Blackburn in 1890. It is known from Australia.

References

modesta
Beetles described in 1890